Marcela Lucatelli (born 13 April 1988) is a Brazilian composer, director, vocalist and performance artist.

Biography 
Lucatelli was born in São Paulo, Brazil, in a family of Italian origins. She studied composition at the Danish National Academy of Music, the Royal Danish Academy of Music and the Danish National School of Performing Arts. She is known for writing "scores for the limits of bodies and voice". Her works have been performed by vocal groups such as the Danish National Vocal Ensemble and Neue Vocalsolisten Stuttgart, together with ensembles such as Apartment House, Bastard Assignments and Mocrep.  Her works have been premiered at Donaueschinger Musiktage, Darmstadt Internationale Ferienkurse für Neue Musik, Nordic Music Days, KLANG - Copenhagen Avantgarde Music Festival, SPOR Festival, Copenhagen Jazz Festival, AllEars Festival for Improvised Music, FILE - Electronic Language International Festival, WOMEX, among other festivals and events worldwide, including contemporary art museums such as Nikolaj Kunsthal, ARKEN and Henie Onstad Art Center. Her music has also been streamed by several national radios including DR P2, BBC 3 and NRK.

Lucatelli's vocals have been described as "inhuman human noise" and her visual expression as "scary and breathtaking". She has been praised for her convincing technique and natural stage presence as an authority. Her work ISYCH, das Moment – or how to describe atomic habits (2019) was described as a Gesamtkunstwerk that "romped through the academic, the popular, the cutting, the banal, the theatrical, the zoological, the unfathomably brilliant, the obfuscatingly bizarre and the rib-ticklingly entertaining". Her aesthetics has been pointed out as a new musical direction to search and new impulses to embed in the music concept.

The cancellation of her first orchestral work RGBW shortly before the first performance sparked debate on social media and in Danish newspapers about whether Danish radio stations and orchestras give enough space to upcoming composers.

Recognition 
In 2016, her performance work decant from 2013 was chosen as the official image for Nordic Music Days at Harpa, in Reykjavik. In 2019, Lucatelli was awarded the Carl Nielsen and Anne Marie Carl-Nielsen Foundation Talent Prize in Composition.

Works

Stage works 

 ISYCH, das moment - or how to describe atomic habits (2019) – music theatre
 Marcela Lucatelli's Brazilian Songbook (2019) – staged concert for ensemble
 Matryhoshka Dogs: The Outerquation (2018) – for viola d'amore, voice and electronics
 23 stories on losing my breath (2018) – for voices, double bass and electronics
 now現在/决不never (2018) – for Chinese and western instruments
 IMPOSSIBLE PENETRATIONS (2018) – music theatre
 Off-Off-Human (2017) – music theatre
 Off-Human (2017) – music theatre
 this is a piece not a WHOL (2016) – for ensemble and electronics
 curandeihits (2015) – staged concert for ensemble
 THE UNAWAITED (2015) – staged concert for voice and electronics
 Ø (2014) – staged concert for children, ensemble and electronics
 XXXPM:LYS(T) (2014) – music theatre
 KapSulaZer0 (2013) – music theatre
 Carnival in a pulse without body (Marcela Lucatelli e o Kollectivo Squizophoniko) (2012) – staged concert for ensemble and narrator
 CICLO (2012)– staged concert for children, ensemble and electronics
 THE ASTROGALACTIC NOISE PARTY (2010) – staged concert for ensemble

Orchestra works 

 RGBW (2019) – for soloist and orchestra

Ensemble works 

 The Golden Days (2018) – for vocal ensemble
 WROTTEN (2018) – for ensemble and electronics
 asteroid 433 Eros (2015) – for ensemble and electronics
 Veritas Sanitas Vanitas (Going Somewhere?) (2015) – for ensemble and electronics
 TUNING TIME (2014) – for ensemble and narrator
 KompensaÇão (2010) – for boys' choir and percussion

Chamber works 

 Four Lilith Valses (2019) – for piano
 A Fairly Tale (2018) – for five voices
 Listen to Ladies (2018) – for acoustic guitar, horn and soprano saxophone
 (meetings unplanned) (2017) – for flute, clarinet, alto saxophone and electric guitar
 Family Portraits (2017) – for voice, viola and horn
 self-help etude nr.1 or variations on skylark motel (2017) – for solo cello
 (I shall lick your teeth while you) project me a heart supply (2015) – for voice and electronics
 AFBRÆK÷ 1 (2014) – for solo recorder
 Dois (2011) – for voice, alto flute, alto saxophone and bass clarinet
 Samba a doze (2010) – for voice and piano

Solo performances 

 Snow Off-White (2019) – solo performance
 Run, Run, Run (2019) – solo performance
 This is all about (2018) –  solo performance
 permission to love beauty (2018) – video-performance
 Speech of Maria Magdalena to her legions (2018) - for solo performer and electronics
 analysis #0.1 (2017) – solo performance
 In-Yer-Face (2016) – for solo performer and electronics
 aim/‘mnot/me - prove you're not a robot (2016) – for solo performer, piano and electronics
 de-cant (2013/2015) – for solo performer and electronics
 pó de marfim (2013) – for solo performer and electronics

Installation works 

 Griefs 'n Tapes (2020) – video series
 A Philosopher Ought to Converse Especially with Men in Power (2020)  – virtual installation
 even sunday (2014) – for solo performer and electronics
 STØVRIGET (2012) – installation
 Fishing dance, fishing music (2011) – for flute, tenor saxophone, bassoon, tuba and narrator
 Translation (2011) – installation

Discography

Albums 

 ANEW (2020, online release, no label, DK)
 PHEW! - The Last Guide for a Western Obituary (2016, two-sided 12", no label, DK)
 *Gestus Kanto-GlyTkH* (2013, online release, no label, BR)

EPs 

 ORAL (2018, two-sided 10", no label, DK)
 EHM (2017, two-sided 10", no label, DK)

Compilations' features 

 I want you hot (at Brain Pussyfication Sampler III, 2018, cassette, no label, DE)
 A Piece for You to Choose (at Sabá: Conexão Rakta, 2016, cassette, no label, BR)
 Even Sunday (at Hystereofônica Vol. 1, 2016, online release, BR)

References

External links 

 Marcela Lucatelli's website
 Interview (2019)

Brazilian composers
1988 births
Living people
Musicians from São Paulo